GRICES or Gabinete de Relações Internacionais da Ciência e do Ensino Superior is the Portuguese Office for International Relations in Science and Higher Education, responsible for directing, guiding and co-ordinating all international cooperation in science and technology.

References

External links

 (archived url at Wayback Machine)

Government agencies of Portugal
Science and technology in Portugal